Wassane Senehasa is a 2012 Sri Lankan Sinhala romantic thriller film directed by Densil Jayaweera and co-produced by Sudath Dharmapriya and Upul Priyankara for Cine Positive Films. It stars Udith Abeyratne and Umayangana Wickramasinghe in lead roles along with Sandani Sulakna and Veena Jayakody. Music composed by Sarath de Alwis. It is the 1171st Sri Lankan film in the Sinhala cinema.

Plot

Cast
 Udith Abeyratne as Pradeep Mayadunne
 Umayangana Wickramasinghe as Nirmala
 Chandika Nanayakkara as Chandana
 Udari Sathsarani as Chandana and Nirmala's daughter 
 Veena Jayakody as Pradeep's mother
 Janak Premalal as Samarasekara
 Wijeratne Warakagoda as Mayadunne
 Rodney Warnakula as Siripala
 Mihira Sirithilaka as Gunapala
 Manohari Wimalathunga as Tharanga's wife
 Sriyani Mahawathe
 Gunawardena Hettiarachchi

Soundtrack

References

2012 films
2010s Sinhala-language films